Weng Wei-pin (born 23 November 1991) is a Taiwanese footballer who currently plays as a defender for the Chinese Taipei national football team.

References

1991 births
Living people
Taiwanese footballers
Chinese Taipei international footballers
Association football defenders
Footballers from New Taipei
Fu Jen Catholic University alumni